Charles Herbert Shaw (10 August 1900 – 1 August 1955) was an Australian journalist and novelist.

Life and career
Shaw was born in South Melbourne, Victoria. His family moved to north-western Victoria when he was a boy, but his parents died when he was in his early teens, and he had to fend for himself, becoming a rural labourer. During the Depression years he held a variety of jobs in the countryside and his interest in writing led him to work at a newspaper in Forbes, New South Wales. Shaw had several stories published by The Bulletin and eventually was employed by the magazine as a rural editor.  

He had two collections of outback short stories, Outback Occupations (1943) and A Sheaf of Shorts (1944), and one volume of verse The Warrumbungle Mare (1943) published as well as two detective stories The Green Token (1943) and Treasure of the Hills (1944). Shaw decided after several rejections that no one outside Australia had an interest in stories about the outback. He wrote a novel, Heaven Knows, Mr. Allison, published in 1952, about a U.S. Marine and a nun on a Japanese-held Pacific island. It was adapted for the screen as a 1957 film by John Huston and John Lee Mahin. The film was nominated for an Academy Award for Best Writing, Screenplay Based on Material from Another Medium in 1957.

In the 1950s Shaw wrote a series of four detective novels about Dennis Delaney under the nom de plume of "Bant Singer", named after his favourite car, a Singer Bantam.  
You're Wrong, Delaney (1953)
Don't Slip, Delaney (1954)
Have Patience, Delaney (1954)
Your Move, Delaney (1956)

He died of a cerebral haemorrhage in Sydney on 1 August 1955. He left a widow and two sons.

References

External links
 
 Australian Literary Resource http://www.austlit.edu.au/run?ex=ShowAgent&agentId=Asy

1900 births
1955 deaths
Australian male novelists
Australian crime writers
20th-century Australian novelists
20th-century Australian male writers
Writers from Melbourne